Home is the debut album by husband-and-wife singers Delaney & Bonnie, released on the Stax label (catalog no. STS-2026). Most of the album was recorded at Stax Studios in Memphis, Tennessee, from February to November 1968, with additional overdubs in July 1969, and features many of Stax's house musicians, including Donald "Duck" Dunn, Steve Cropper, Booker T. Jones, and Isaac Hayes.

The album's cover photo shows Delaney and Bonnie with Delaney's grandfather, John Bramlett, in front of the log cabin in Pontotoc, Mississippi, where Delaney grew up.

Stax released two singles from the album in the U.S., "It's Been a Long Time Coming" (1969) and "Hard to Say Goodbye" (1970).  (The latter was issued to capitalize on the success of Delaney and Bonnie's later recordings for Atco/Atlantic, which once had a partnership with Stax.) "Just Plain Beautiful" b/w "Hard to Say Goodbye" was also issued as a single in the UK in 1969.

Home was remastered and re-released by Stax / Universal on CD, including several bonus tracks, in 2006.  However, the remaster is in MONO only (although the cover states "AAD/Stereo). All previous vinyl, tape and CD issues were in stereo.  The album's two US single A-sides are also included in the Stax compilation box set The Complete Stax/Volt Soul Singles, Vol. 2 – 1968–71.

Track listing

2006 Resequenced and Expanded Edition
"A Long Road Ahead" (Radle, B. Bramlett, D. Bramlett) – 3:01 Recorded November 1, 1968 and July 1, 1969
"My Baby Specializes"  (Hayes, Porter) – 3:15 – Recorded February 27, 1968
"Things Get Better"  (Cropper, Floyd, Jackson) – 2:22 – Recorded February 27, 1968
"We Can Love"  (Cropper, Floyd) – 2:23 – Recorded August 6, September 13, 1968, July 2nd 1969
"All We Really Want to Do" (D. Bramlett, B. Bramlett) – 2:54 – Recorded November 1, 1968 and July 2, 1969
"It's Been a Long Time Coming"  (D. Bramlett, B. Bramlett) – 2:26 – Recorded February 7, 1968
"Just Plain Beautiful"  (Cropper, Crutcher) – 2:09 – Recorded August 6, September 13, 1968
"Everybody Loves a Winner"  (Jones, Bell) – 4:45 – Recorded November 1, 1968, July 1, 1969
"Look What We Have Found" (unknown) – 2:59 – unknown
"Piece of My Heart"  (Berns, Ragovoy) – 4:45 – Recorded November 1, 1968, July 1, 1969
"A Right Now Love"  (B. Bramlett, Banks) – 2:19 – Recorded August 6, September 13, 1968
"I've Just Been Feeling Bad" (Cropper, Floyd) – 2:54 – Recorded February 27, 1968
"Dirty Old Man" (D. Bramlett, Davis) – 2:37 – Recorded August 7, 1968
"Get Ourselves Together" (Radle, B. Bramlett, D. Bramlett) – 2:27 – Recorded August 6, 1968
"Pour Your Love on Me"  (Banks, B. Bramlett) – 2:47 – Recorded August 7, September 13, 1968, July 2nd 1969
"Hard to Say Goodbye"  (B. Bramlett, Radle) – 2:30 – Recorded August 7, 1968, July 1, 1969

Personnel

Delaney Bramlett – guitar, vocals
Bonnie Bramlett – vocals
Leon Russell – keyboards
Booker T. Jones – keyboards
Isaac Hayes – keyboards, vocals
Steve Cropper – guitar
Donald Dunn – bass
Carl Radle – bass
Al Jackson Jr. – drums
Jimmy Karstein – percussion
 The Memphis Horns :
Wayne Jackson – trumpet
Andrew Love – tenor saxophone
Joe Arnold – saxophone
Dick Steff – trumpet
Jay Pruitt – trumpet
John Davis – trumpet
Ben Cauley – trumpet
Ed Logan – tenor saxophone
Jim Terry – saxophone
William Bell – vocals
Phil Forrest – vocals

Production
Producer: Don Nix, Donald Dunn
Recording Engineer: Ron Capone
Art Direction: Jamie Putman
Photography: Barry Feinstein
Cover Design: Tom Wilkes
Liner Notes: Michael Point
Special thanks to the friends of Delaney & Bonnie and Leon Russell.

References

Delaney & Bonnie albums
1969 debut albums
Stax Records albums
Albums produced by Donald "Duck" Dunn
Albums produced by Don Nix